Jim Veal (13 September 1901 – 5 May 1965) was a former Australian rules footballer who played with Melbourne in the Victorian Football League (VFL).

Notes

External links 

1901 births
1965 deaths
Australian rules footballers from Victoria (Australia)
Melbourne Football Club players
Golden Point Football Club players